Heat and Dust (1975) is a novel by Ruth Prawer Jhabvala that won the Booker Prize in 1975. The book was also ranked by The Telegraph in 2014 as one of the 10 all-time greatest Asian novels.

Plot summary
The initial stages of the novel are told in the first person, from the narrative voice of a woman who travels to India, to find out more about her step-grandmother, Olivia. She has various letters written by Olivia, and through reading these, and learning from her own experiences in India, she uncovers the truth about Olivia and her life during the British Raj in the 1920s.

Through the use of flashbacks, the reader experiences the story from Olivia's point of view. We discover that Olivia, although at first glance she seems simply to be a proper Englishwoman, is actually smothered by British social restrictions, and longs for excitement. She meets the Nawab, who instantly charms her, and gradually lets her into his life. Olivia is drawn to the charm and charisma of the Nawab, and he slowly gains control over her, as he does with other characters such as Harry. Harry is portrayed as weak due to his homosexuality and inability to withstand the Indian climate and food.

Olivia eventually becomes pregnant with the Nawab's baby, and out of fear decides to abort the child. This causes scandal in the town of Satipur. She then resides in an unnamed town ("Town X") for her remaining years. The novel ends with the present-day narrator (whose name is not mentioned) also becoming pregnant, deciding to spend her years in Town X, just as Olivia did.

Awards
1975: Booker Prize

Film
The novel was made into a film of the same name in 1983 by Merchant Ivory Productions. It was an award-winning film, with a screenplay by Ruth Prawer Jhabvala based upon her novel, directed by James Ivory and produced by Ismail Merchant.

References

External links
 Summary from Merchant Ivory website
Booker Prize Winners

Booker Prize-winning works
1975 British novels
British historical novels
British novels adapted into films
Films scored by Nishat Khan
Harper & Row books
John Murray (publishing house) books
Novels set in India
Novels set in the 1920s
Postcolonial novels